Cody Allen Eppley (born October 8, 1985) is an American former professional baseball pitcher and coach. He played in Major League Baseball (MLB) for the Texas Rangers and New York Yankees.

Amateur career
Eppley attended Northern High School in Dillsburg, Pennsylvania, where he pitched for the school's baseball team. He then enrolled at Virginia Commonwealth University (VCU), where he played college baseball for the VCU Rams baseball team, competing in the Colonial Athletic Association of the National Collegiate Athletic Association's Division I.

Professional career

Texas Rangers

The Texas Rangers drafted Eppley in the 43rd round of the 2008 Major League Baseball Draft.

He pitched for the Arizona Rangers of the Rookie-level Arizona League and Clinton LumberKings of the Class A Midwest League in 2008. He was named an Arizona League All-Star. Eppley played for the Hickory Crawdads of the Class A South Atlantic League in 2009. The Rangers promoted Eppley to the Bakersfield Blaze of the Class A-Advanced California League to begin the 2010 season, and then promoted him to the Frisco RoughRiders of the Class AA Texas League in May and Oklahoma City RedHawks of the Class AAA Pacific Coast League (PCL) in July. He was assigned to the Round Rock Express, the Rangers' new PCL affiliate, in 2011.

Eppley was called up to the majors for the first time on April 23, 2011. He was optioned back to the minors in May.

The Rangers designated Eppley for assignment at the end of spring training in 2012. The Yankees claimed him off waivers.

New York Yankees
Eppley started the 2012 season with the Scranton/Wilkes-Barre Yankees of the Class AAA International League. They recalled him on April 19, then optioned him to Scranton/Wilkes-Barre after long reliever D. J. Mitchell was recalled to the Yankees on April 29, 2012. Eppley was 0–0 with a 1.69 ERA in 4 games with New York.

On May 4, 2012, Eppley was called back up to the parent club to take Mitchell's roster spot, along with outfielder DeWayne Wise after pitcher Mariano Rivera sustained an Anterior cruciate ligament tear. He was optioned back to Scranton/Wilkes-Barre, and recalled again on May 15 to replace David Robertson, who strained an oblique muscle.

Eppley made the Yankees Opening Day roster in 2013, but after giving up 4 runs in 1.2 innings, he was optioned to Triple-A. After pitching to an 8.53 ERA with Scranton/Wilkes-Barre through 19 games in the 2013 season, the Yankees released Eppley on June 5.

Minnesota Twins
On June 14, the Minnesota Twins signed Eppley to a minor league contract, and assigned him to the Triple-A Rochester Red Wings of the International League. He opted out of his contract August 21. In 22 appearances with Rochester, he was 2–0 with a 4.88 ERA, striking out 20 in 24 innings.

Lancaster Barnstormers
Eppley made 6 appearances with the Lancaster Barnstormers of the Atlantic League of Professional Baseball in September, going 0–1, giving up 1 run in 4.1 innings with 4 strikeouts. Despite now pitching in independent baseball, Eppley said, "being able to get out and wake up every morning and go to the ballpark, that's what it's all about."

Pittsburgh Pirates
Eppley signed a minor league deal with the Pittsburgh Pirates on November 26, 2013. Eppley gave up 2 runs in 5.2 innings over 7 appearances with 3 saves in Spring Training. He began the season with Triple-A Indianapolis, where in 13 games, he was 2–1 with a 6.43 ERA. On June 19, Eppley was released by the Pirates.

Southern Maryland Blue Crabs
Eppley signed with the Southern Maryland Blue Crabs for the 2015 season. He spent all of 2015 and 2016 with the team and on March 30, 2017, he resigned with the team. On April 18, 2018, he resigned with the team for the 2018 season. He became a free agent following the 2018 season.

Lancaster Barnstormers (second stint)
On March 28, 2019, Eppley signed with the Lancaster Barnstormers of the Atlantic League of Professional Baseball. He became a free agent following the season.

Coaching career
On March 12, 2020, Eppley announced his retirement as an active player, and signed on as pitching coach for the Lancaster Barnstormers. He did not return for the 2021 season and instead began working for Financial company Northwestern Mutual.

Pitching style
Eppley threw with an unusual sidearm delivery. He threw a four-seam fastball and sinker in the high 80s. He also had a slider in the low 80s and an occasional changeup.  Eppley's low arm slot made him very effective against right-handed batters, but also largely ineffective against left-handed batters. It also allowed him to generate a very large number of groundballs.

Personal life
Cody and his wife Caitlin were married on November 21, 2020.

References

External links

1985 births
Living people
Texas Rangers players
New York Yankees players
Baseball players from Pennsylvania
Major League Baseball pitchers
VCU Rams baseball players
Arizona League Rangers players
Clinton LumberKings players
Hickory Crawdads players
Bakersfield Blaze players
Frisco RoughRiders players
Oklahoma City RedHawks players
Round Rock Express players
Scranton/Wilkes-Barre Yankees players
Scranton/Wilkes-Barre RailRiders players
Rochester Red Wings players
Indianapolis Indians players
Lancaster Barnstormers players
Yaquis de Obregón players
American expatriate baseball players in Mexico
Southern Maryland Blue Crabs players
People from Dillsburg, Pennsylvania
Venados de Mazatlán players